Rhamnus petiolaris is a species of flowering plant  in the family Rhamnaceae. It is native to Iraq, Lebanon, Syria, and Turkey.

Uses
Rhamnazin is an O-methylated flavonol, a type of chemical compound that can be found in R. petiolaris.

References

External links

Diagn. pl. orient. ser. 2, 5:75. 1856

petiolaris
Endemic flora of Sri Lanka
Plants described in 1856
Taxa named by Pierre Edmond Boissier
Taxa named by Benjamin Balansa
Flora of Iraq
Flora of Lebanon
Flora of Syria
Flora of Turkey